Fortress (矢倉 or 櫓 yagura) is both a Static Rook opening (矢倉戦法 yagura senpō) and a castle in shogi.

It is usually played in a Double Static Rook opening, which is often a Double Fortress opening. However, it may also occur in different Double Static Rook openings such as Fortress vs Right Fourth File Rook.

The Fortress castle (矢倉囲い yagura gakoi), which is the defining characteristic of Fortress games, was considered by many to be one of the strongest defensive positions in Double Static Rook games in the 1980s.

The term yagura is the Japanese word for a tower-like structure in traditional Japanese castles.

Double Fortress 

The most commonly encountered Fortress strategies occur in Double Fortress games where both players use a Fortress formation.

Historical Fortress 

Earlier josekis for Fortress in the Edo period (usually spelled 櫓 at that time) were very different from the current josekis.

For instance, in one variation, it is White who delays pushing their rook pawn (whereas Black delays the rook pawn push in the modern era) and an early bishop trade occurs before both players' kings are moved into their castles.

vs Right Fourth File Rook

vs Snowroof

The Snowroof strategy can be played against a Fortress opponent.

Rapid Attack Fortress

Rapid Attack Fortress strategies are characterized by the fact that White will start the fight following Black's blocking of the bishop's diagonal. These are active plans where White wants to avoid a development in which Black takes hold of the initiative. The side playing Fortress aims at building up a position wary of the rival's rapid attack. There are a number of variations:

 Sitting King Bogin (or "Super Rapid Attack Bogin")
 Right Fourth File Rook
 Central Rook Fortress
 Masuda Rapid Attack Fortress
 Yonenaga Rapid Attack Fortress
 Akutsu Rapid Attack Fortress (also known as Nakahara, Goda or Watanabe Rapid Attack)
 Crab Silvers

The rapid attack strategy will vary depending on whether in the fifth move Sente plays P-66 or S-77. For example, both Sitting King Bogin and Right Fourth File Rook are played following P-66, while Central Rook Fortress and Akutsu Rapid Attack Fortress are played following S-77. Yonenaga Rapid Attack Fortress can be played against either.

vs White's Left Mino

1. P-76 P-84

2. S-68 P-34

3. P-66 S-62

4. P-56 P-54

5. S-48 G61-52

6. G49-58 S-32

7. G-67 P-44

8. S-77 G-43

9. B-79 B-31

10. P-36

See also

 Fortress castle
 Fortress vs Right Fourth File Rook
 Static Rook
 Shogi opening

References

Bibliography

External links

 How to Defend in Shogi (by Yasuharu Ōyama):
 Basic Formation 4: Yagura
 Basic Formation 5: Gin-yagura
 YouTube Hidetchi's:
 How to play Shogi (将棋): Lesson 14: Opening Principles · Contains some discussion of Fortress opening (from 2 min 28 sec)
 Rapid Encountered Yagura, Primitive Climbing Silver
 Shogifan 将棋ファン: Yagura -1 矢倉
 Shogi Openings (professional Akira Nishio's blog):
 About a Yagura castle
 Basic Tactics For Breaking Yagura Castle (1)
 Basic Tactics For Breaking Yagura Castle (2)
 Basic Tactics For Breaking Yagura Castle (3)
 Basic Tactics For Breaking Yagura Castle (4)
 Shogi Shack:
 Yagura Intro
 Shogi Maze:
 Yagura Opening Formation
 Yagura Strategy: How To Build The Formation
 Shogi Opening:
 Yagura: Akutsu Style Pawn-55 Rapid Attack
 Yagura: Time Lugging Climbing Silver
 Yagura: 3 Move Bishop Strategy
 Yet Another Shogi Site: 
 Yagura Rapid Attack: Yonenaga/Fujimori style against ▲P35 variation
 Double Yagura: Identical formation
 将棋タウン: 矢倉戦法
 Shogi Planet: (Yagura) Static Bishop + (left) Mino Castle
 Lectures on the Latest Strategies: Lecture 2: Yagura

Shogi openings
Static Rook openings
Fortress openings